Hitsertse Kade is a hamlet  in the Dutch province of South Holland and is part of the municipality of Hoeksche Waard.

Hitsertse Kade is not a statistical entity, and is considered part of Klaaswaal. It has a little marina and some holiday homes.

References

Populated places in South Holland
Hoeksche Waard